Agrotera nemoralis, the beautiful pearl, is a species of moth of the family Crambidae. It was first described by Giovanni Antonio Scopoli in his 1763 Entomologia Carniolica.

Taxonomy
The rather similar Agrotera posticalis, described from Japan, instead of a synonym is often treated as a valid species.

Distribution
This widespread species can be found from Europe to India, China and Japan.

Description
The wingspan of Agrotera nemoralis can reach 20–24 mm. Forewings are brown with an orange reniform spot and a clear band with an irregular post median line. Wing fringes are white with irregular brown bands.

Biology
The moths fly from May to July depending on the location. They are active at dusk. The larvae feed on leaves of Carpinus betulus, but are also spotted on hazel, birch and chestnut.

The young larvae usually live on the underside of leaves. Then they spins two leaves together. They overwinter in a cocoon, where pupation takes place.

Gallery

References 

 Emmet, A.M. (1979) [ed] A Field Guide to the Smaller British Lepidoptera 1–271, The British Entomological and Natural History Society. London.

External links 

 Lepiforum
 Hants Moths
 Naturhistoriska risksmuseet
 Moths and Butterflies of Europe and North Africa

Moths described in 1763
Spilomelinae
Moths of Asia
Moths of Europe
Taxa named by Giovanni Antonio Scopoli